Gary McLellan is a Scottish filmmaker and former student of the SAE Institute in Glasgow. In July 2019, he became the deputy director of the Glasgow Filmmakers Alliance following the promotion of Chris Quick to director of the organisation. On 31 December 2021, McLellan stood down as deputy director.

Filmography

See also 
Glasgow Filmmakers Alliance
SAE Institute

References

External links
Glasgow Filmmakers Alliance

Living people
Film people from Glasgow
Year of birth missing (living people)